M. S. Sanjeevi Rao was an Indian politician. He was elected to the Lok Sabha, the lower house of the Parliament of India from the Kakinada in Andhra Pradesh as a member of the Indian National Congress.

Early life 
His father was an Indian independence activist. He studied electronics and telecommunications at the Imperial College London.

Career 
After returning to India, he started working at the All India Radio. Later, he joined the Defence Research and Development Organisation. He was posted at the Electronic and Radar Development Establishment, Bengaluru, and then at the Defence Research Electronics Laboratory, Hyderabad.

Political Career 
Rao entered politics after his father's death. He was elected to the Lok Sabha, and later appointed minister in Indira Gandhi's cabinet.

Personal life 
Rao had two children, including M. M. Pallam Raju.

References

External links
Official biographical sketch in Parliament of India website

1929 births
2014 deaths
Lok Sabha members from Andhra Pradesh
Indian National Congress politicians
India MPs 1971–1977
India MPs 1977–1979
India MPs 1980–1984